The Flute Sonata in D, Op. 94, is a musical work composed by Sergei Prokofiev in 1943. It was initially composed for flute and piano, and was later transcribed for violin as Op. 94a, both versions have been recorded several times. The piece contains four different movements.

History 

The Flute Sonata in D was completed in the summer of 1943. At that same time, Prokofiev was working on music for "Ivan the terrible". The flute sonata in D was first performed in Moscow, Russia on December 7, 1943 by Nicolai Kharkovsky (flute) and Sviatoslav Richter (piano). It was later transcribed for violin in 1944, by the composer with the help of violinist David Oistrakh, as Op. 94a. The violin version was first performed by David Oistrakh (violin) and Lev Oborin, Piano, on June 17, 1944.

Movements

There are four movements:
 Moderato 
 Scherzo: Presto 
 Andante 
 Allegro con brio

References
Notes

Sources

External links
 
 Prokofiev Flute Sonata performed by Boris Bizjak and Simon Lane

 Sonata Op. 94 I Moderato - Prokofiev interpretada por el flautista Adrian Altamura.

Chamber music by Sergei Prokofiev
Prokofiev
1943 compositions
Compositions in D major